The 2020–21 ISU Grand Prix of Figure Skating was a series of invitational senior internationals which ran from October 2020 through December 2020. Medals were awarded in the disciplines of men's singles, ladies's singles, pair skating, and ice dance. Originally, before modifications resulting from the COVID-19 pandemic, skaters would have earned points based on their placement at each event and the top six in each discipline would have qualified to compete at the Grand Prix Final in Beijing, China. Due to the pandemic, only four of the six events were held as scheduled, with the Grand Prix Final also ultimately cancelled.

Organized by the International Skating Union, the series sets the stage for the 2021 Europeans, the 2021 Four Continents, and the 2021 World Championships. The corresponding series for junior-level skaters was scheduled to be the 2020–21 ISU Junior Grand Prix, before the ISU announced its cancellation in July 2020.

Reactions to the COVID-19 pandemic 
On May 1, 2020, the International Skating Union established a working group, chaired by ISU Vice-president for Figure Skating Alexander Lakernik, to monitor the ongoing COVID-19 pandemic. Its responsibilities include determining the feasibility of holding events as scheduled, possibly behind closed doors, during the first half of the 2020–21 season and the financial impact of any potential cancellations. The ISU announced that a host federation must make a decision regarding potential cancellation of their event at latest 12 weeks prior to the event.

On July 9, the General Administration of Sport of China announced that no international sporting events would be held in China in 2020, except for 2022 Winter Olympics test events. The Chinese Skating Association was scheduled to host several events during the season, including the Cup of China and the Grand Prix Final. While the Grand Prix Final, to be hosted in Beijing, was exempt from the Chinese government's ruling due to its status as the test event for the Olympic Games, the ISU had not yet discussed a contingency plan regarding Grand Prix event cancellations at the time of the Chinese government's announcement. The ISU announced on July 13 that the Cup of China remains as scheduled in Chongqing, China, due to its connection to the Beijing test event, the Grand Prix Final.

On August 4, the ISU confirmed that the Grand Prix series would proceed as scheduled during the fall, with a decision to be made regarding the Grand Prix Final at a later date. The competitions are expected to feature skaters from the home country, skaters already training in the host nation, and skaters assigned to that event for geographic reasons; all officials will also be from the national organizing member.

On August 28, Yuzuru Hanyu of Japan became the first prominent skater to officially withdraw from participating in the series. On September 28, Kazakhstan's Elizabet Tursynbaeva, who missed the previous season due to injury, announced that she would not participate, citing the altered format and lack of ranking points awarded.

On September 25, U.S. Figure Skating announced that Skate America would be held without an audience present, in line with Nevada Gaming Control Board guidelines regarding the pandemic.

On September 30, the ISU announced that the Grand Prix Final would not be held as scheduled in Beijing on December 10–13. The ISU is searching for an alternate host, outside China, for the postponed event. On October 14, Skate Canada announced the cancellation of 2020 Skate Canada International, due to the worsening situation in Ontario. The French Federation of Ice Sports informed the ISU of the cancellation of 2020 Internationaux de France on October 19.

On November 13, a joint adapted sports testing program developed by the Beijing 2022 planning committee, the IOC, the IPC, and various winter sports federations, including the ISU, replaced all scheduled Beijing test events. Despite the ongoing pandemic, the ISU announced that it would evaluate the possibility of finding alternative locations outside China and dates to replace the Grand Prix Final.

On December 10, the ISU announced the definitive cancellation of the Grand Prix Final, alongside that of the 2021 European Championships.

The domestic nature of the competitions meant that no ISU World Standing/Ranking points were awarded to skaters and the scores received would not count for minimum TES requirements for ISU Championships (i.e. non-official scores).

Schedule
The series will comprise the following events:

Cancelled

Requirements 
Skaters were eligible to compete on the senior Grand Prix circuit if they had reached the age of 15 before July 1, 2020. Due to the modified format, skaters were not required to meet a minimum total score from certain international events. Competitors assigned to an event are generally from the home country, are already training in the host nation, and/or are assigned to that event for geographic reasons, with respect to current travel restrictions.

Assignments
As part of the ISU's efforts to mitigate the risks associated with the ongoing coronavirus pandemic, skaters were limited to one assignment each. Assignments were released on October 1, 2020.

Men

Women

Pairs

Ice dance

Changes to preliminary assignments

Skate America

Skate Canada
The event was cancelled on October 14.

Cup of China

Internationaux de France
The event was cancelled on October 19.

Rostelecom Cup

NHK Trophy

Medal summary

Medalists

Medal standings
The competitions were largely domestic events due to the pandemic, leading to skaters from the home country dominating the medals table at each respective event.

Qualification 
Due to the pandemic-modified nature of the events, the qualification structure for the eventually cancelled 2020–21 Grand Prix Final was never clearly determined.

Top scores

The scores awarded on the 2020–21 Grand Prix will not count for minimum TES requirements for the ISU Championships and do not count as official personal bests, season's bests, or world records.

Men

Best total score

Best short program score

Best free skating score

Ladies

Best total score

Best short program score

Best free skating score

Pairs

Best total score

Best short program score

Best free skating score

Ice dance

Best total score

Best rhythm dance score

Best free dance score

References

ISU Grand Prix of Figure Skating
Grand Prix
ISU Grand Prix of Figure Skating